Paul S. Newman (April 29, 1924 – May 30, 1999) was an American writer of comic books, comic strips, and books, whose career spanned the 1940s to the 1990s. Credited in the Guinness Book of World Records as the most prolific comic-book writer, with more than 4,100 published stories totaling approximately 36,000 pages, he is otherwise best known for scripting the comic-book series Turok for 26 years.

Biography

Early life and career
Newman was born in New York City, the son of Mr. and Mrs. Joseph J. Newman. He served his World War II military service in the Po Valley campaign in Italy, earning a service star as an enlisted man in a bomb disposal unit, and, later, as a first lieutenant special-services officer aboard troop transports. Following his discharge, he attended Dartmouth College, graduating in 1947.

That same year, Newman broke into comic books with DC Comics' teen-humor series A Date with Judy, based on the radio program, for which Newman had originally applied to write. He went on to script for Avon Comics, Fawcett Comics, Hillman Periodicals, St. John Publications, Ziff Davis, and, as a staff writer, at Marvel Comics' two predecessor companies, Timely Comics and Atlas Comics.

At Timely/Atlas, where he and other staff writers were officially titled editors, Newman worked on the teen-humor series Patsy Walker, Hedy Devine and Jeannie under editor-artist Al Jaffee. Under Atlas editor-in-chief Stan Lee, he wrote stories (generally uncredited, as were virtually all those of the staff writers) for such horror/mystery titles as Journey into Mystery and Marvel Tales, as well as for romance titles.

Turok, whose uncredited creation is disputed, debuted in an issue of the omnibus title Four Color Comics and, after a second issue in that series, continued as issue No. 3 of Turok, Son of Stone (the first issue of that series under its own name), published by Western Publishing — first through its business partner Dell Comics and then through its own label, Gold Key Comics. The uncredited Newman was one of the series' writers, along with Gaylord DuBois, from its inception in 1954.

Newman had an additional decades-long run on the character the Lone Ranger, in the Dell Comics comic-book series. With artist Tom Gill, Newman chronicled the adventures of the radio, television and comic-strip Western hero from #38–145 (April 1948 – July 1962), the final issue.

Silver Age of comics
In 1962, Newman and Western Publishing editor Matt Murphy created the character Doctor Solar. Later that decade, Newman wrote the comic-book adaptation of the Beatles' animated feature Yellow Submarine. By the 1980s, he was writing for the DC Comics series G.I. Combat and House of Mystery; for the Disney comic Darkwing Duck; and industrial films and audio-visual presentations.

Comic strips

Newman additionally wrote issues of Dell Comics' Tom Corbet comic book.

Among his other strips are Laugh-In (with artist Roy Doty), based on the TV show; Smokey Bear; Robin Malone; and The Lone Ranger.

Big Little Books and Whitman Authorized Editions
Newman was also the credited writer of numerous entries in Western Publishing Company's Big Little Book series for children, including writing licensed spin-off works based upon the TV series, The Invaders and the comic book character, Aquaman. He also wrote for Western's line of Whitman "Authorized Edition" hardcovers for young readers; among his works included a novel based upon the TV series, Gunsmoke.

Awards and accolades
Newman won a 1998 Inkpot Award for his lifetime contribution to the comic-book field. He was a 1997 nominee for the Will Eisner Award Hall of Fame.

The Guinness Book of World Records credits Newman as the most prolific comic-book writer, with more than 4,100 published stories totaling approximately 36,000 pages.

Personal
In 1985, the once-divorced Newman married his second wife, Carol Wernick, project coordinator of youth leadership for the New York City Board of Education. The ceremony by Rabbi Max Ticktin took place at Newman's New York City home. Newman was the father of two children, Peter Newman and Lisa Newman. Newman died of a heart attack in Columbia, Maryland, where he and his wife lived.

References

External links

Evanier, Mark. "Tom Gill, R.I.P.", October 18, 2005.
Newman, Paul S. "The Unknown Paul Newman". Comic Book Marketplace No. 19 (Nov. 1992) pp. 56, 58
Tom Gill interview: Alter Ego #43 (Dec. 2004)
Metcalf, Greg. "If You Read It, I Wrote It: The Anonymous Career of Comic Book Writer Paul S. Newman". The Journal of Popular Culture. Volume 29, Issue 1 (Summer 1995) pp. 147–162

1924 births
1999 deaths
American comics writers
Silver Age comics creators
Atlas Comics
Marvel Comics people
Inkpot Award winners